The following are the winners of the 15th annual ENnie Awards, held in 2015:

Judges' Spotlight Winners
Dragons in the Stacks: A Teen Librarian’s Guide to Tabletop Role-Playing (Libraries Unlimited) – Annah Madrinan
Wicked Lies and Alibis (Imaginary Empire) – Stacy Muth
Posthuman Pathways (Genesis of Legend Publishing) – Jakub Nowosad
Firefly Echoes of War: Thrillin' Heroics (Margaret Weis Productions) – Kayra Keri Küpçü
East Texas University (Pinnacle Entertainment Group) – Kurt Wiegel

Gold and Silver Winners

References

External links
 2015 ENnie Awards

 
ENnies winners